Louis Allamandola is an American space scientist, currently at Astrophysics & Astrochemistry Laboratory of NASA and an Elected Fellow of American Association for the Advancement of Science.

References

Year of birth missing (living people)
Living people
Fellows of the American Association for the Advancement of Science
American astrophysicists
NASA people
Fellows of the American Astronomical Society